Following is a list of dams and reservoirs in New Jersey.

All major dams are linked below.

Dams and reservoirs in New Jersey

This list is incomplete.  You can help Wikipedia by expanding it.
Beatties Dam, Passaic River Little Falls
Brick Township Reservoir, Brick Township Municipal Utilities Authority
Butler Reservoir, Passaic County
Colonial Lake, Lawrence Township
Dundie Dam, Passaic River
Furry Lake, East Brunswick and North Brunswick
Furnace Road Dam, Wanaque Reservoir,  North Jersey District Water Supply Authority
Hackensack Reservoir No. 2, United Water New Jersey
Jersey City Reservoir No. 3
Lake Carnegie Dam, Lake Carnegie, Princeton University
Lake Hopatcong Dam, Lake Hopatcong, New Jersey Division Of Parks And Forestry
Lake Musconetcong Dam. Lake Musconetcong
Lake Tappan Dam, Lake Tappan, United Water New Jersey
Manasquan Reservoir Dam, Manasquan Reservoir, New Jersey Water Supply Authority
Mercer Lake, Mercer County Park
Merrill Creek Dam, Merrill Creek Reservoir, Merrill Creek Owners Group
Monksville Dam, Monksville Reservoir, North Jersey District Water Supply
Oradell Reservoir Dam, Oradell Reservoir, United Water New Jersey
Parsippany Dike, Boonton Reservoir (Jersey City Reservoir), Jersey City Department of Water
Point View Dam, Point View Reservoir, Passaic Valley Water Commission
multiple dams, Round Valley Reservoir, New Jersey Water Supply Authority
Shadow Lake Dam, on Nut Swamp Brook in Monmouth County
S.U.M. Dam, Passaic River Paterson
Spruce Run Reservoir Dam, Spruce Run Reservoir, New Jersey Water Supply Authority
Lake Sylva, The College of New Jersey
Woodcliff Lake Dam, Woodcliff Lake Reservoir, United Water New Jersey
Yards Creek Generating Station, upper and lower reservoirs

References 

New Jersey
Dams
Dams